The World Design Exhibition 1989 (Japanese: 世界デザイン博覧会), also abbreviated "Design-Haku", was an event held at the Nagoya Congress Center July 15 - November 26, 1989. It was hosted by the World Design Organization. Other venues included Nagoya Castle and Nagoya Port.  

It was visited by over 15 million people. The congress of the host organisation was also held there in the same year. 

Following the expo the International Design Centre Nagoya was established in 1992 and opened in 1996.

Pavilions
Shirotori venue
Theme Pavilion
White Museum - Fuji Baking,Chunichi Shimbun and Tokai-TV shared the same building space.
NTT Challenge Pavilion
Hikari Theater - Chubu Electric Power.
Mitsui&Toshiba Pavilion
Matsushita Pavilion
Third Planet Pavilion - Morimura Group.
NEC C&C Pavilion
Sumitomo Pavilion
Mitsubishi Future Pavilion
Toyota Group Pavilion
Toho Gas Fantasy World
Interior Pavilion- Karimoku and Sangetsu shared the same building space.
Fujitsu Pavilion 3DCG Theater
Hitachi Group Pavilion
Meitec&Chunichi Shimbun&CBC Pavilion
Aichi 21st Century Pavilion
Yume Shugo Σ21
Ovarseas Exhibitors Pavilion
Shirotori Stage
Nagoya Castle venue
Water Fantasy Palace - Meitetsu Group.
Gaudi Castle
Creative Factory Tokai Bank Pavilion
Karakuri Wonder Land Nagoya City Pavilion
Chubu no Takumi Pavilion
Pachinko Pachislot Omoshiro Design Pavilion
Rinnai Honmaru Stage
Nagoya Port venue
Uny Group Pavilion
Tokimeki City Pavilion - Aichi Bank and Chukyo Bank shared the same building space.
JR Tokai Linear Station
Nippon Sharyo Pavilion Los Angeles Square
Design Eye Arena Asahi & Menicon Pavilion
Port Gallery
Port Stage

See also 
 Nagoya Pan-Pacific Peace Exposition
 Expo 2005

References 

1989 in Japan
July 1989 events in Asia
August 1989 events in Asia
September 1989 events in Asia
October 1989 events in Asia
November 1989 events in Asia
Exhibitions in Japan
Fairs in Japan
History of Nagoya

ja:世界デザイン博覧会